"Don't Be Afraid" is a song by American singer Aaron Hall. It was produced by Hank Shocklee and Gary G-Wiz.  It was one of the singles taken from the soundtrack for the 1992 film Juice starring 2Pac. The song's drum loop is sampled from Sing a Simple Song by Sly and the Family Stone.

Background
The song has four versions.  The original uptempo version featured on the Juice soundtrack, the second called "Jazz You Up version," has a different beat and updated lyrics and instead of the female backing vocals, Aaron sings the respective vocals in their place. The song as a whole was met with controversy due to its overtly sexual nature.  In response, an alternate version to the song was released, called the "Sex You Down Some Mo'" and features a slower tempo and different lyrics and a 4th version which is the Nasty Man's Groove version. One version is on the Juice soundtrack, with the Jazz You Up and Sex You Down Some Mo versions featured on Hall's The Truth album the year after and the fourth on the single. A fifth version, the Pressure Point Remix, features on the single.

Chart performance
"Don't Be Afraid" spent two weeks at #1 on the US R&B chart (making it Aaron Hall's highest charting R&B hit) and peaked at #44 on the Billboard Hot 100.

Charts

Weekly charts

Year-end charts

See also
List of number-one R&B singles of 1992 (U.S.)

References

1992 debut singles
1991 songs
Aaron Hall (singer) songs
MCA Records singles
New jack swing songs
Songs written by Aaron Hall (singer)